Edward Craig Klass (born June 20, 1965 in Wiesbaden, Hessen) is a former water polo player who won the silver medal for the United States at the 1988 Summer Olympics in Seoul, South Korea. A graduate of Las Lomas High School in Walnut Creek, California and Stanford University, he also competed for the United States at the 1992 Summer Olympics in Barcelona, Spain. In 2000, he was inducted into the USA Water Polo Hall of Fame.

See also
 List of Olympic medalists in water polo (men)

References

External links
 

1965 births
Living people
American male water polo players
Stanford Cardinal men's water polo players
Olympic silver medalists for the United States in water polo
Water polo players at the 1988 Summer Olympics
Water polo players at the 1992 Summer Olympics
Sportspeople from Wiesbaden
Place of birth missing (living people)
Medalists at the 1988 Summer Olympics